John Hanson (born 3 December 1962) is an English former footballer.

He played for Bradford City and Scarborough.

He currently resides in Christchurch, New Zealand.

Notes

1962 births
Living people
English footballers
Association football forwards
Bradford City A.F.C. players
Scarborough F.C. players
English Football League players
National League (English football) players
Footballers from Bradford